"Soldier On!" is a song by American thrash metal band Megadeth. It was released as the third single from their sixteenth studio album, The Sick, the Dying... and the Dead! on August 12, 2022. It is more mid-tempo and melodic than other songs on the album, and contains some elements of groove metal.

Music and lyrics
"Soldier On!" features much military imagery, both in the lyrics, and in the official visualizer.

In an interview with Kerrang, frontman Dave Mustaine said: "Is Soldier On! a song about war? No. It's about how you need to be brave when walking away from a relationship. It's like that Irish poem about turning your collar up against the wind and having the sun shine on your face. It's about being in that relationship, knowing that something is not right, and understanding that you need to leave."

"Coming to the realization that you need to walk away from a relationship that's very toxic, and how hard it can be to start down that road. But you know you need to, and just taking that first step is the hardest part," comments Mustaine, "Whatever your leaving does to them, you have to block that part out, stay the course and do what's right for you. It will be hard in the beginning, but you have got to live for yourself to be worth a damn to anyone else. You've got to Soldier On!"

The ending of the music video features a military foot drill, which features service members from Fort Campbell.

Charts

Personnel 
Megadeth
 Dave Mustaine – lead and rhythm guitars, lead vocals, additional bass
 Kiko Loureiro – lead guitar, backing vocals
 Dirk Verbeuren – drums

Additional musicians
 Steve Di Giorgio – bass
 Brandon Ray – additional vocals
 Eric Darken – percussion
 Roger Lima – keyboards and effects
 John Clement – voices
 The Marching Metal Bastards – voices
Production

 Dave Mustaine – co-production, engineering, art concept
 Chris Rakestraw – co-production, engineering
 Lowell Reynolds – assistant engineering
 Maddie Harmon – assistant engineering
 Rick West – drum technician
 Josh Wilbur – mixing
 Ted Jensen – mastering

References

External links 
Music video

Megadeth songs
2022 songs
2022 singles
Songs written by Dave Mustaine